Žarko Jovanović (26 December 1925 – 26 March 1985) was a Serbian Romani musician who is known for composing the Romani anthem Gelem, Gelem.

Biography
Jovanović was born in Batajnica, suburb of Belgrade in 1925. During World War II he was imprisoned in three camps. After that he joined the Yugoslav Partisans. At the time of war, Jovanović lost most of his family. He moved to Paris on February 21, 1964. Jovanović was known as Romani activist. He participated on two Romani Congresses, one in 1971 near London and other in 1978 in Geneve. On the Second Roma Congress he was named Romani Culture Minister. He was known in Paris for playing a balalaika, a Russian traditional instrument. Jovanović died in Paris in 1985.

References

1925 births
1985 deaths
Serbian Romani people
Romani activists
Romani musicians
Musicians from Belgrade
Serbian composers
Yugoslav Partisans members
Yugoslav Romani people
20th-century composers